Mark Heyes (born 24 January 1977) is a British fashion journalist, fashion presenter, writer and broadcaster who is known for his appearances on Lorraine. He graduated from the Glasgow School of Art with a BA (Hons) degree in design, and broke through on Channel 4's She's Gotta Have It as an on-screen and behind the scenes stylist. In 2009, The Guardian listed him in their Top 100 Most Influential People in the Fashion Industry.

References

External links 
 Mark Heyes - GMTV profile
 

Living people
British fashion journalists
Mass media people from Glasgow
Place of birth missing (living people)
Scottish television personalities
GMTV presenters and reporters
ITV Breakfast presenters and reporters
Scottish fashion
Alumni of the Glasgow School of Art
Fashion stylists
1977 births